The Clark County Government Center serves as the government center building for Clark County, Nevada. It is located in Downtown Las Vegas. The   complex was designed by Fentress Bradburn and opened in 1995. It consists of a six-story county administration building, three one-story buildings for the county commissioners’ chambers, a multipurpose community facility and a central plant. The building also includes space for government administration, a law enforcement complex, a performing arts complex, a child-care facility and structured parking. It also contains a single-story auditorium, a pyramid-shaped cafeteria and a cylindrical, six-story reception hall, as well as office buildings.

The government center is organized around a multifunctional County courtyard and shaded pedestrian spine. The shaded, circular arcade supplements the circular form of the buildings. Aligned radially with the columns are three rows of trees framing a sloped lawn amphitheater. A centered raised platform creates the stage. It has accommodated public gatherings and performances.

Awards 
The Center has received awards including “Best Non-Hotel Architecture” and the “People’s Choice Las Vegas Journal” award in 1998, 1999, 2000, 2001, 2002, 2003, 2004 and 2005.

Notes

Buildings and structures in Las Vegas
County government buildings in Nevada
Clark County, Nevada
Downtown Las Vegas
Government buildings completed in 1995
Pyramids in the United States
1990s architecture in the United States
1995 establishments in Nevada